Jorge Eliécer Julio Rocha (born April 4, 1969) is a Colombian former professional boxer who competed from 1989 to 2003. He is a two-time bantamweight champion, having held the WBA title from 1992 to 1993, and the WBO title from 1998 to 2000. As an amateur he won a bronze medal in the bantamweight division at the 1988 Summer Olympics.

Amateur
At the 1988 Summer Olympics he won a bronze medal in the men's Bantamweight category after losing to Aleksandar Khristov.

Olympic results 

Below are the results of Jorge Eliecer Julio, a Colombia Bantamweight boxer who competed at the 1988 Seoul Olympics:

 Round of 64: Defeated Michael Hormillosa (Philippines) TKO 3
 Round of 32: Defeated Felipe Nieves (Puerto Rico) points
 Round of 16: Defeated Rene Breitbarth (East Germany) points
 Quarterfinal: Defeated Katsuyuki Matsushima (Japan) points
 Semifinal: Lost to Aleksandar Khristov (Bulgaria) points (was awarded bronze medal)

Pro
Julio turned pro in 1989 and won his first twenty-six fights, culminating on 9 October 1992 with a win over southpaw Eddie Cook for the WBA Bantamweight title. He lost the belt in a unanimous decision to Junior Jones in 1993 but was the first to knock Jones down.

He went on to capture the WBO Bantamweight title in 1998 but lost the belt in 2000 to Johnny Tapia. His career then began to go downhill and in 2002 he lost to Manny Pacquiao by TKO, and again in 2003 to Israel Vázquez.

See also
List of bantamweight boxing champions

References

External links
 
 databaseOlympics.com

1969 births
Living people
Olympic boxers of Colombia
Boxers at the 1988 Summer Olympics
Olympic bronze medalists for Colombia
Bantamweight boxers
Super-bantamweight boxers
World bantamweight boxing champions
World Boxing Association champions
World Boxing Organization champions
Medalists at the 1988 Summer Olympics
Olympic medalists in boxing
Colombian male boxers
Sportspeople from Magdalena Department
20th-century Colombian people